Florian Fritsch (born 29 October 1985) is a German professional golfer who currently plays on the European Tour.

Career
Fritsch was born in Munich, Germany, and attended the University of South Carolina in the United States, graduating in 2008. He turned professional in early 2009, and almost became the third golfer, after countryman Martin Kaymer, and Italian Edoardo Molinari, ever to win on their Challenge Tour début, when he lost to Lee S. James in a playoff for the Allianz Open Côtes d'Armor Bretagne.

2010 he quit from professional golf because of a fear of flying that developed through the years after a flight where he experienced huge clear-air turbulences. After a few months he took up his professional career again. He only played in tournaments he could reach by car or by train. Nevertheless he reached the final qualifying stage of the European Tour and earned his card for the 2011 season.

After finishing 125th on the 2015 Race to Dubai and missing the full-card for the 2016 season, in 2016 he finished 101st thanks to his T7 placements in the Omega European Masters, at the Porsche European Open and at the Alfred Dunhill Links Championship. He secured his full-card for 2017 playing just 12 tournaments, due to his flying fears and his low-ranking spot in 2016.

Professional wins (9)

Pro Golf Tour wins (6)

Nordic Golf League wins (1)

Hi5 Pro Tour wins (1)

Other wins (1)
2013 German PGA Championship

Playoff record
Challenge Tour playoff record (0–3)

Team appearances
Amateur
European Boys' Team Championship (representing Germany): 2003
European Youths' Team Championship (representing Germany): 2004, 2006
Eisenhower Trophy (representing Germany): 2004, 2006
European Amateur Team Championship (representing Germany): 2005, 2007, 2008

See also
2010 European Tour Qualifying School graduates
2014 Challenge Tour graduates

References

External links

Florian Fritsch at the University of South Carolina Gamecocks official site

German male golfers
South Carolina Gamecocks men's golfers
European Tour golfers
Sportspeople from Munich
Sportspeople from Heidelberg
1985 births
Living people